Zach Ziemek (born February 23, 1993) is an American athlete competing in the decathlon. Ziemek won the bronze medal at the 2022 World Championships in Eugene with a personal best score of 8676  In 2021 he finished 6th at the Tokyo Olympics. He represented his country at the 2015 World Championships in Beijing, where he finished 15th. Ziemek finished 7th in the decathlon at the 2016 Olympics.

Career
At the 2020 United States Olympic Trials (track and field) Ziemek came third behind Garrett Scantling and Steve Bastien (athlete) with an Olympic qualifying score to earn a spot at the delayed 2020 Tokyo Olympics. At the trials, Ziemek set the world record in the decathlon jumping events with performances of 7.74 in the long jump, 2.14 in the high jump, and 5.55 in the pole vault. Only three other men have ever gone higher in an 8000+pt decathlon: Erki Nool (5.60m in his 8628, 1998), Aleksandr Averbukh (5.60m in his 8084, 1997) and Timothy Bright (5.70m in his 8216, 1988)

His main personal bests are 8471 points in the decathlon (Eugene 2021) and 6173 points in the indoor heptathlon (Birmingham 2016).

Ziemek resides in Sun Prairie, WI and trains at his alma mater the University of Wisconsin-Madison.  He is coached by Nate Davis, assistant coach for the Wisconsin track & field team. He is married to Victoria Paulson Ziemek.

Competition record

Personal bests
Outdoor
 100 metres – 10.55 (0.0 m/s) (Tokyo 2021)
 400 metres – 49.04 (Eugene 2016)
 1500 metres – 4:40.05 (Athens 2021)
 110 metres hurdles – 14.29 (+1.6 m/s) (Madison 2017)
 High jump – 2.14 (Eugene 2021)
 Pole vault – 5.55 (Eugene 2021)
 Long jump – 7.73 (+1.7 m/s) (Eugene 2014)
 Shot put – 14.99 (Tokyo 2021)
 Discus throw – 50.90 (Des Moines 2018)
 Javelin throw – 60.92 (Rio de Janeiro 2016)
 Decathlon – 8471 (Eugene 2021)
Indoor
 60 metres – 6.75 (Birmingham 2016)
 1000 metres – 2:48.25 (Geneva, OH 2013)
 60 metres hurdles – 8.03 (Iowa City 2018)
 High jump – 2.06 (Geneva, OH 2013)
 Pole vault – 5.40 (Fayetteville 2013)
 Long jump – 7.48 (Birmingham 2016)
 Shot put – 14.53 (Birmingham 2016)
 Heptathlon – 6173 (Birmingham 2016)

References

1993 births
Living people
People from Itasca, Illinois
Track and field athletes from Chicago
American male decathletes
Wisconsin Badgers men's track and field athletes
World Athletics Championships athletes for the United States
World Athletics Championships medalists
Athletes (track and field) at the 2016 Summer Olympics
Olympic track and field athletes of the United States
USA Outdoor Track and Field Championships winners
Athletes (track and field) at the 2020 Summer Olympics